Italian football clubs have entered European association football competitions (UEFA Champions League/European Cup, UEFA Europa League/UEFA Cup, Inter-Cities Fairs Cup, UEFA Europa Conference League and the now defunct UEFA Intertoto Cup and UEFA Cup Winners' Cup) since season 1955–56, when Milan took part in European Cup competition. Nowadays, Italian football is the fourth force in Europe according to UEFA ranking, following the Spanish, English and German football. Italian clubs have also entered several times worldwide inter-club competitions since the 1963 Intercontinental Cup.

The golden age of Italian football since the establishing of UEFA is regarded to have occurred in the 1980s and in the 1990s, when several Italian clubs won UEFA competitions, contributing to Serie A obtaining the highest confederation coefficient score for about fifteen years. Since the beginning of 21st century, the force of Italian football at international stage has decreased, mainly after the Calciopoli scandal.

So far, the Italian clubs have won twelve times the Champions League/European Cup (Milan, Internazionale and Juventus), seven times the UEFA Cup Winners' Cup (Milan, Fiorentina, Juventus, Lazio, Parma and Sampdoria), nine times the Europa League/UEFA Cup (Internazionale, Juventus, Parma and Napoli), one time the Europa Conference League (Roma), nine times the UEFA Super Cup (Milan, Juventus, Lazio and Parma), four times the UEFA Intertoto Cup (Bologna, Juventus, Perugia and Udinese), one time the Inter-Cities Fairs Cup (Roma), seven times the Intercontinental Cup (Internazionale, Milan and Juventus), and two times the FIFA Club World Cup (Internazionale and Milan).

European and worldwide competitions winners from Italy

UEFA competitions winners from Italy

Cups and finals

European competitions

UEFA Champions League/European Cup

UEFA Cup Winner’s Cup/European Cup Winner’s Cup

UEFA Europa League/UEFA Cup

UEFA Europa Conference League

Inter-Cities Fairs Cup

UEFA Super Cup

UEFA Intertoto Cup

Intertoto Cup (before UEFA)

Mitropa Cup

Latin Cup

Worldwide competitions

Intercontinental Cup

FIFA Club World Cup

Full European record
Note: Clubs in bold won the respective season's competition.

UEFA Champions League/European Cup
The competition was named European Cup until 1991–92, after which it switched its name to UEFA Champions League.

UEFA Europa League/UEFA Cup
The competition was named UEFA Cup until 2008–09, after which it switched its name to UEFA Europa League.

UEFA Europa Conference League

UEFA Cup Winners' Cup

Inter-Cities Fairs Cup
While the Inter-Cities Fairs Cup (1955–1971) is recognised as the predecessor to the UEFA Cup, it was not organised by UEFA. Consequently, UEFA does not consider clubs' records in the Fairs Cup to be part of their European record.

UEFA Intertoto Cup
Although the tournament was founded in 1961–62, it was only taken over by UEFA in 1995.

Qualification to European competitions
Seven teams from Italy qualify for European competitions.

The Serie A winners and clubs finishing 2nd, 3rd and 4th qualify to the UEFA Champions League group stage, while two other teams (one being the Coppa Italia winners) qualify to the UEFA Europa League. The club finishing 6th qualifies for the play-off round of the UEFA Europa Conference League. If the Coppa Italia winner already qualified for the UEFA Champions League or Europa League, then the club finishing 6th qualifies for the Europa League group stage and the 7th qualifies for the play-off round of the Conference League.

UEFA coefficient records
 Record-high ranking: 1st from 1986 to 1989 and from 1991 to 1999
 Record-low ranking: 12th in 1982

Participation of Italian clubs in European competitions 
The following table shows the number of seasons in which Italian clubs took part in the three European seasonal cups (including the Inter-Cities Fairs Cup).

 UCL = UEFA Champions League (European Cup)
 CWC = UEFA Cup Winners' Cup
 UEL = UEFA Europa League (UEFA Cup)
 UECL = UEFA Europa Conference League
It takes into account competitions in which Italian clubs have taken part in the season kick-off, namely in the month of September when, usually, UEFA Champions League, Europa League and Europa Conference League group stages start. It does not take into account qualifying rounds held during the summer. Azure denotes clubs that experienced a Champions League group phase, pink a Europa League group phase, and green a Conference League group phase.

When two or more clubs have the same number of participations, they are sorted by the number of seasons in the most important competition.

Consecutive seasons in European competitions 
Teams in bold: active streak.
Only the best result of each teams is shown

Head-to-head against other European clubs

By country
Sources:

Key

As of matches played on 16 March 2023

By club 
Sources:
Key

As of matches played on 16 March 2023

See also
Serie A

Footnotes

References

External links
Italian clubs in European cups on RSSSF.com

 
European football clubs in international competitions